David Michaels (born October 11, 1954) is an American epidemiologist and professor in the Departments of Environmental and Occupational Health and Epidemiology at the Milken Institute School of Public Health of the George Washington University. He held high-level public health positions in the administrations of Presidents Barack Obama and Bill Clinton.

Education and early life 
Michaels graduated from the City College of New York, and holds a Master in Public Health (MPH) and a PhD from Columbia University. Before joining the faculty of the George Washington University, he taught at the CUNY School of Medicine and the Albert Einstein College of Medicine.

Career 
From 2009 to January 2017, Michaels served as the Assistant Secretary of Labor for the Occupational Safety and Health Administration (OSHA). Nominated by President Barack Obama and unanimously confirmed by the U.S. Senate, Michaels served as OSHA’s 12th Assistant Secretary, the longest serving administrator in OSHA's history.

As Assistant Secretary, Michaels issued new health standards protecting workers exposed to silica and beryllium, strengthened the agency's enforcement in high risk industries, expanded OSHA's whistleblower protection program, promoted common sense worker protection programs and standards, increased compliance assistance provided to small employers, and focused outreach on the vulnerable populations who are at greatest risk for work-related injury and illness. He also increased OSHA's capabilities in the areas of data analysis and program evaluation.

Michaels served as the United States Department of Energy's Assistant Secretary for Environment, Safety, and Health from 1998 through January 2001. In this position, he had primary responsibility for protecting the health and safety of workers, the neighboring communities and the environment surrounding the nation's nuclear weapons facilities. Michaels developed the initiative to compensate workers in the nuclear weapons complex who developed cancer or lung disease as a result of exposure to radiation, beryllium, silica, or other hazards. That initiative resulted in the Energy Employees Occupational Illness Compensation Program, which has provided over $18 billion in benefits to sick workers and the families of deceased workers since its inception in 2001.

During the HIV/AIDS epidemic, Michaels developed a widely used mathematical model to estimate the number of children orphaned by the disease.   In addition, while employed at Montefiore Medical Center in the Bronx, NY, he helped found and directed the Epidemiology Unit at the Montefiore-Rikers Island Health Service, the first such unit at a jail in the United States.

Writings 
 
Michaels has written extensively on issues related to the integrity of scientific information that serves as the basis of public health and environmental regulation. His studies and articles have been published in Science, JAMA, Scientific American, the International Journal of Epidemiology, the American Journal of Public Health and other scientific journals.

He is the author of The Triumph of Doubt: Dark Money and the Science of Deception (Oxford University Press, 2020). In her review in Science magazine, Sheril Kirshenbaum described the book as "a tour de force that examines how frequently, and easily, science has been manipulated to discredit expertise and accountability on issues ranging from obesity and concussions to opioids and climate change.” In Nature, Felicity Lawrence wrote that “The Triumph of Doubt is a brave and important book, raising the alarm about the systemic corruption of science.”

Michaels is also the author of Doubt is Their Product: How Industry's Assault on Science Threatens Your Health (Oxford University Press, 2008). In his review in Science magazine, Carl F. Cranor asks "Ever wonder why it has been so slow and difficult to reduce the health risks from tobacco, secondhand smoke, lead, beryllium, or chromium? David Michaels's excellent Doubt Is Their Product provides part of the explanation, showing numerous ways in which “the product defense industry” uses scientific (and pseudoscientific) arguments to undermine public health protections, corrupt the scientific record, and mislead the public."

Awards 
In February 2006, Michaels was awarded the American Association for the Advancement of Science's Award for Scientific Freedom and Responsibility. He has also received the American Public Health Association's David P. Rall Award for Advocacy in Public Health, the 2009 John P. McGovern Science and Society Award of Sigma Xi, the American Conference of Governmental Industrial Hygienists (ACGIH®) William D. Wagner Award and the US Department of Energy's Meritorious Service Award.

Personal life 
Michaels lives in the Washington, D.C., area with his wife Gail Dratch.  He has two children, Joel Michaels and Lila Michaels. He is the son of photojournalist Ruth Gruber, step-brother of writer and activist Barbara Seaman, and cousin of science writer Dava Sobel.

See also
The Triumph of Doubt
Doubt Is Their Product
Energy Employees Occupational Illness Compensation Program

References

External links

American epidemiologists
City College of New York alumni
Living people
1954 births
George Washington University faculty